The city of Montevideo, capital of Uruguay, is divided into 62 barrios (neighborhoods or districts), each with its own identity, demographic characteristics and activities appropriate to the socio-cultural level of its inhabitants. The outer barrios of Montevideo are largely rural.

In a more general usage of the word barrio, some people refer to the biggest large-scale residential complexes of Montevideo as barrios, although they do not appear as such in official lists. Such are the Parque Posadas in Aires Puros, the Euskal Erría complexes in Malvin Norte and others.

Many areas of the city that are now considered barrios had geographically independent populations that were later absorbed into the growing city. This is the case with Sayago, Pocitos, Carrasco and others. Some barrios grew out of industrial areas, such as Cerro and Nuevo París. Other areas that were considered distinct barrios have been subsumed into larger barrios. Such is the barrio Goes, most of which has been incorporated in Villa Muñoz, while smaller parts of it were incorporated in Aguada and La Figurita, the barrio Arroyo Seco which has been incorporated in Bella Vista, the Barrio Borro, Retiro and others. As a consequence, different maps may show differences in the number and the borders of some barrios. This list and its accompanying map follow the division in barrios of the National Institute of Statistics of Uruguay.

List of barrios

References

External links

 Map of the Instituto Nacional de Estadística showing the 62 barrios (PDF)
 Map of the RAP CEIBAL showing  the 62 barrios
 Revista Raíces, the history of some of the barrios
 Intendencia de Montevideo, the history of some of the barrios
 Intendencia de Montevideo, useful data for some of the barrios
 Intendencia de Montevideo - List of the 62 barrios

 
Montevideo

pt:Categoria:Bairros de Montevidéu